Richard Donald Crenna (November 30, 1926 – January 17, 2003) was an American film, television and radio actor.

Crenna starred in such motion pictures as The Sand Pebbles, Wait Until Dark, Un Flic, Body Heat, the first three Rambo films, Hot Shots! Part Deux, and The Flamingo Kid. His first success came on radio in 1948 as high school student Walter Denton co-starring with Eve Arden and Gale Gordon in the CBS series Our Miss Brooks. Crenna continued with the comedy in its 1952 move into television. He also starred as Luke McCoy in the ABC, and later CBS, television series The Real McCoys (1957–1963). In 1985, he won the Primetime Emmy Award for Outstanding Lead Actor in a Limited or Anthology Series or Movie for his portrayal of the title role in The Rape of Richard Beck.

Early life
Crenna was born November 30, 1926, in Los Angeles, California, the only child of Edith Josephine (née Pollette), who was a hotel manager in Los Angeles, and Domenick Anthony Crenna, a pharmacist. His parents were both of Italian descent. Crenna attended Virgil Junior High School, followed by Belmont Senior High School in Los Angeles, from which he graduated in 1944. He served in the U.S. Army during World War II, entering the Army in February 1945 and serving until August 1946.

After his Army service, Crenna attended the University of Southern California (USC), where he earned a Bachelor of Arts degree in English literature and was a member of the Kappa Sigma fraternity.

Acting career

Radio years
Crenna got his acting start on radio. In 1937, he had gained his first role, that of "the kid who did everything wrong" on Boy Scout Jamboree, a show on which he continued to appear occasionally in numerous roles until 1948. In the following year, he started playing Walter "Bronco" Thompson on The Great Gildersleeve, a role he played until 1954. He also originated the role of geeky Walter Denton on the Radio Comedy Our Miss Brooks alongside Eve Arden and Gale Gordon in 1948, and followed that role when the series moved to television in 1952. He remained in that role until 1957. He appeared as a delivery boy in My Favorite Husband (episode "Liz Cooks Dinner for 12"), was Oogie Pringle on A Date With Judy (episode "The Competitive Diet", among several other episodes of the show) and as a teenager on The George Burns and Gracie Allen Show (episode "Watching the Neighbor's Daughter").

Early television years
Crenna played Walter Denton on radio's Our Miss Brooks, remaining with the cast when it moved into television in 1952. He remained with the show until it was canceled in 1957. He guest-starred on the I Love Lucy episode "The Young Fans", with Janet Waldo and on NBC's 1955–56 anthology series Frontier, in the lead role of the episode entitled "The Ten Days of John Leslie". In 1955, he was the guest star on The Millionaire in the episode "The Ralph McKnight Story".

Crenna appeared in 1956 on the television series Father Knows Best, in the episode "The Promising Young Man," as a young man named Woody. In 1957, he played a bank robber on the Cheyenne television series (season 2, episode 19).

After Our Miss Brooks was canceled in 1957, Crenna joined the cast of the comedy series The Real McCoys as Luke McCoy; his co-star was veteran actor Walter Brennan, who played Grandpa Amos McCoy. Kathleen Nolan was cast as his young wife, Kate McCoy. Crenna ultimately became one of the series's four directors during its six-year run (1957–63).

1960s–1970s
Credited as "Dick Crenna," he directed eight episodes of The Andy Griffith Show during its 1963-1964 season including such gems as "Opie the Birdman," "The Sermon for Today," and the Gomer Pyle-instigated "Citizen's Arrest." Crenna also helmed "Henhouse," a 1977 episode of the CBS drama Lou Grant starring Ed Asner.

Crenna portrayed California state senator James Slattery in the CBS-TV series Slattery's People (1964–65). For his acting in this series, he was twice nominated for an Emmy Award with slightly different names: for "Outstanding Individual Achievements in Entertainment" and for "Outstanding Continued Performance by an Actor in a Leading Role in a Dramatic Series", both in 1965. Crenna was also nominated for a Golden Globe Award for "Best TV Star – Male" for this same role, again in 1965. In 1966, Crenna played beside Steve McQueen as an ill-fated captain of an American gunboat in 1920s China in The Sand Pebbles.

During the 1970s, Crenna continued acting in such Western dramas such as The Deserter, Catlow, The Man Called Noon, and Breakheart Pass. He made a notable performance in Jean-Pierre Melville's final film Un Flic in 1972. In 1976, Crenna returned to weekly network television in the Norman Lear CBS sit-com All's Fair, a political satire co-starring Bernadette Peters. Despite high expectations and good critical reviews, it lasted just a single season. The 1978 NBC-TV miniseries Centennial, based on James A. Michener's historical novel of the same name, saw Crenna in the role of deranged religious fanatic Colonel Frank Skimmerhorn, who ordered the 1864 massacre of Colorado American Indians.

1980s–early 2000s
Crenna won an Emmy Award and a Golden Globe Award for Best Performance by an Actor in a Mini-Series or Motion Picture Made for Television nomination for his performance in the title role of the 1985 film The Rape of Richard Beck.

Crenna then played John Rambo's ex-commanding officer, Colonel Sam Trautman, in the first three Rambo films, a role for which he was hired after Kirk Douglas left the production a day into filming. Trautman became the veteran actor's most famous role; his performance received wide critical praise. He also spoofed the character in Hot Shots! Part Deux in 1993.

Crenna portrayed New York City Police Department lieutenant of detectives Frank Janek in a series of seven popular made-for-television films, beginning in 1988 and ending in 1994. The character of Janek had originally appeared in a series of novels by William Bayer.

Legacy
Crenna was awarded a star on the Hollywood Walk of Fame at 6714 Hollywood Boulevard.

Illness and death
Crenna developed pancreatic cancer and died of heart failure at age 76, on January 17, 2003, at Cedars-Sinai Medical Center with his wife, Penni, and his three adult children by his side, according to his daughter, Seana Crenna. His remains were cremated.

Filmography

Film

Television

Video games

Awards and nominations

See also

References

External links

 
 

1926 births
2003 deaths
20th-century American male actors
American male film actors
American male radio actors
American male television actors
United States Army personnel of World War II
American people of Italian descent
American television directors
Television producers from California
Belmont High School (Los Angeles) alumni
Deaths from cancer in California
Deaths from pancreatic cancer
Male actors from Los Angeles
Outstanding Performance by a Lead Actor in a Miniseries or Movie Primetime Emmy Award winners
United States Army non-commissioned officers
University of Southern California alumni
People from Bunker Hill, Los Angeles